The Saint Anthony Hall Trinity College chapter house is an historic fraternity building located at 340 Summit Street in Hartford, Connecticut. Built between 1877 and 1878, it is a significant early work of the American architect J. Cleaveland Cady. The building was listed on the National Register of Historic Places in November, 1985.

History
Trinity College's Delta Psi (St. Anthony Hall), known as the Epsilon chapter, was founded on October 17, 1850. Its members have played significant roles throughout the college's history. The chapter house was built between 1877–1878 to a design by architect J. Cleaveland Cady, a Trinity College 1860 alumnus and a Delta Psi member. The building was completed at a cost of $68,00—$40,000 of which was donated by Robert Habersham Coleman, an 1877 Trinity graduate and Delta Psi fraternity member, who become, albeit briefly, the wealthiest man in the United States. Other fraternity members donated as well toward construction and land acquisition, and the building was completed free of debt.

The Epsilon chapter house is the first building constructed in the United States for the sole purpose of being a college fraternity house.

Architecture
Saint Anthony Hall is located on Gallows Hill, topographically the highest elevation Hartford, just north of the Trinity College campus, on the corner of Summit Avenue and Allen Place. It is a two–story French Gothic Revival building finished with a façade made of quarried New Hampshire granite laid in random courses. Externally, it appears to be rectangular structure with a rounded apse at one end and a steeply pitched hip roof. Prominent features include round towers, one tall and the other short, at two corners of the building, each topped by a conical roof with flared eave. On one long side a gabled section projects, with a pair of arched stained glass windows surmounted by a round window, also of stained glass.

Cady's design for the Epsilon chapter house was a departure from many collegiate secret society buildings of the time, particularly the ones at Yale; its large windows, both front and back, as well as its prominent oak front doors with carved glyphs were seen as a welcoming feature, yet its imposing architecture did not fail to communicate a strong element of secretiveness that continued to mark the character of the organization.

Furthermore, it continues to serve strictly as a meeting hall with no dormitories or sleeping facilities, a characteristic of secret societies. Prominent features include an ample foyer at the entrance, an octagonal living room, a library which at the time of the house's construction served as the fraternity dining room, and recreational facilities in the basement, including a pool table room, a bar room, and a reception area. Today, it is the oldest of the St. Anthony Hall fraternity's houses still in use.

Renovation and addition 
With the 2001 inspection failure of an external metal fire–escape that had been grandfathered in by the City of Hartford years before, alumni members led a campaign to bring the building's fire exit door into compliance through the addition of a smaller second tower on the left rear side of the building. A fundraising campaign was launched to complete the structure within a year. Careful measures had to be taken to harmonize this addition with the rest of the building, so a design was chosen that would blend harmoniously with the tower. The granite on the exterior of the addition came from the same New Hampshire quarry that provided the exterior for the original building. Precautions were taken to improve the entrance and exit into the basement area, as well as convert the old hatch door fire escape into a full size door. The new addition was inaugurated in 2003.

See also
National Register of Historic Places listings in Hartford, Connecticut

References

External links 
 Victor Katz' photographs of the Trinity College Delta Psi fraternity

National Register of Historic Places in Hartford, Connecticut
Clubhouses on the National Register of Historic Places in Connecticut
Gothic Revival architecture in Connecticut
Buildings and structures completed in 1878
Buildings and structures in Hartford, Connecticut
Fraternity and sorority houses
St. Anthony Hall
Trinity College (Connecticut)